Events in the year 1926 in Turkey.

Parliament
 2nd Parliament of Turkey

Incumbents
President – Kemal Atatürk
Prime Minister – İsmet İnönü

Ruling party and the main opposition
 Ruling party – Republican People's Party (CHP)

Cabinet
4th government of Turkey

Events
1 January –Turkey began using international calendar and timing instead of the traditional one
17 February – Civil code
1 March – Modern criminal code 
18 March – A magnitude 6.9 earthquake, with a maximum intensity of VIII (Severe), occurs in the Mediterranean Sea southwest of Kaş in the Antalya Province. Some people are killed.
11 April – Partial mobilization as a precaution after a speech of Italian dictator Benito Mussolini
19 April – Modern Cabotage law
22 April – Modern Obligations code
29 May – Modern Commercial code
5 June – Treaty concerning the future of Mosul (Which was a part of Turkey at the end of World War I but annexed by the United Kingdom during the armistice day following the war.)
15 June – A plot to assassinate Mustafa Kemal was uncovered in İzmir 
20 June – Crisis between the prime minister İsmet İnönü and the special court about the court's right to arrest of Kazım Karabekir who was an MP. (Mustafa Kemal mediated and the crisis ended on the 5th of July) 
2 August – The French S.S. Lotus collided with the Turkish S.S. Bozkurt. 
6 October – First airplane factory in Kayseri
12 October – Lotus issue was brought to international courts (see 2 August)
22 October – The 6.0  Kars earthquake occurs with a maximum Mercalli intensity of IX (Violent). The shock was close to the border and affected both Turkey and Armenia, leaving 360 people dead

Births
15 February – Doğan Güreş, chief of staff
28 February – Erol Taş, actor
6 June – Erdal İnönü, physics professor, politician
22 August – Ümit Yaşar Oğuzcan, poet
5 September – Süleyman Seba longest presiding Chairman of Beşiktaş J.K. sports club
29 October – Necmettin Erbakan, prime minister (54th government of Turkey)

Deaths
12 July – Ziya Hurşit (born in 1892), politician
13 July – Rüştü Pasha (born in 1872), retired general and politician 
26 August – Mehmet Cavit Bey (born in 1875), politician, economist 
26 August – Nazım Bey (born in 1870), MD and politician

Gallery

References

 
Years of the 20th century in Turkey
Turkey
Turkey
Turkey